Scraping is a live album, drawn primarily from Calexico's 2002 concert at San Francisco's Great American Music Hall. Two tracks are from a 2001 performance at the Temple of Music and Art in Tucson AZ, while a third was recorded at the 2000 Roskilde Festival in Denmark.

The recording features several songs with the Mariachi Luz De Luna.

Track listing
 "Wash"
 "The Ride (Part II)"
 "Sonic Wind"
 "Frontera/Trigger"
 "El Picador"
 "Sanchez"
 "Fade"
 "Wind Up Bird"
 "Minas de Cobre"
 "Lost In Space"
 "Stray"
 "Crystal Frontier"
 "Paper Re-Route"

References

Calexico (band) albums
2002 live albums